Euaspis is a genus of bees belonging to the family Megachilidae.

The species of this genus are found in Africa and Southeastern Asia.

Species:
 Euaspis aequicarinata Pasteels, 1980 
 Euaspis basalis (Ritsema, 1874)

References

Megachilidae